Typical topics include the Nagorno-Karabakh conflict, Armenian genocide, and other Armenian-related issues. Many print media are published in more than one language, usually offering Russian and English sections in addition to the main Armenian section.

List of Daily Newspapers

Artsakh